Danylo Kravchuk (born 2 July 2001) is a Ukrainian professional footballer who plays as a forward for Inhulets Petrove on loan from Vorskla Poltava.

Career
Kravchuk is a product of FC Arsenal Kyiv youth sportive system. In August 2018 he signed contract with the Ukrainian Premier League FC Vorskla and played for it in the Ukrainian Premier League Reserves and Under 19 Championship during 1,5 season.

In March 2020 he was promoted to the main squad to play in the Ukrainian Premier League for Vorskla. Kravchuk made his debut in the Ukrainian Premier League for FC Vorskla as a substitute on 31 May 2020, playing in a home match against FC Lviv.

References

External links
 
 
 

2001 births
Living people
Ukrainian footballers
Association football forwards
FC Vorskla Poltava players
FC Inhulets Petrove players
Ukrainian Premier League players
Ukraine under-21 international footballers